The lists contains cases of alleged violations of rights of Romani people brought before the European Court of Human Rights, European Committee of Social Rights, CJEU and United Nations human rights treaty bodies.

Chronological lists

    
Ongoing ECHR cases: Mihaylova and Malinova v. Bulgaria (36613/08), V.T. v. Bulgaria (51776/08), Dimov v. Bulgaria (57123/08), Kirilov v. Bulgaria (50292/09). Ongoing ECSR case: European Roma and Travellers Forum (ERTF) v. the Czech Republic (104/2014).

Lists by issues

Police, prison ill-treatment
Assenov and Others v. Bulgaria
Velikova v. Bulgaria
Anguelova v. Bulgaria
Ognyanova and Choban v. Bulgaria
Sashov v. Bulgaria
Eremiášová and Pechová v. the Czech Republic
 Bekos and Koutropoulos v. Greece 
 Petropoulou-Tsakiris v. Greece
 Kalamiotis v. Greece 
 Karagiannopoulos v. Greece 
 Stefanou v. Greece
 Katsaris v. Greece
 Ciorcan and others v Romania
 Burlya and Others v. Ukraine
 M.F. v. Hungary
 Lingurar v. Romania
 A.P. v. Slovakia
 Jusinova v. North Macedonia
 Redjepovi v. North Macedonia
 Pastrama v. Ukraine
 Memedov v. North Macedonia

Lack of protection from racist violence and threats by private persons
Škorjanec v. Croatia
Király and Dömötör v. Hungary

Education
D. H. and Others v. Czech Republic
Sampanis and Others v. Greece
Oršuš and Others v. Croatia
Sampani and Others v. Greece
Lavida and Others v. Greece
ERRC and MDAC v. Czech Republic

Elections
Sejdić and Finci v. Bosnia and Herzegovina

Housing
Buckley v. UK
Chapman v. UK
Coster v. UK
Lee v. UK
Connors v. UK
ERRC v. Greece
Interights v. Greece
ERRC v. Portugal
ERRC v. France
Bagdonavicius and Others v. Russia
Yordanova and Others v. Bulgaria
Georgopoulos v. Greece
Hudorovič and Others v. Slovenia

Defamation
F. v. UK
Molnar v. Romania
Budinova and Chaprazov v. Bulgaria

Sterilizations, family law
K.H. and Others vs. Slovakia
I.G. and Others v. Slovakia 
V.C. v. Slovakia
N.B. v. Slovakia
Z.K. v. Slovakia
Terna v. Italy

Generalising court approach
Paraskeva Todorova v. Bulgaria

References

External links
Council of Europe Jurisprudence on Roma
Roma and travellers Factsheet of ECtHR, 2013
Execution of European Court of Human Rights’ judgments concerning Roma. Brief overview of main cases under Committee of Ministers’ supervision, Council of Europe
The European Social Charter and Roma Rights

Romani cases
Rights cases
Cases
European Court of Human Rights case law
European Committee of Social Rights case law
United Nations Human Rights Committee case law